Sorcery may refer to:

 Magic (supernatural), the application of beliefs, rituals or actions employed to subdue or manipulate natural or supernatural beings and forces
 Witchcraft, the practice of magical skills and abilities
 Magic in fiction, the use of supernatural magic in works of fiction
 Sorcery (horse) (1808 – after 1832), British Thoroughbred racehorse

Arts and entertainment 
 Sorcery!, 1983–1985 gamebook series by Steve Jackson
 Sorcery! (video game), 2013–2016 video game series based on the gamebooks
 Sorcery (video game), 2012 video game
 Sorcery (band), American rock band active 1976–1987
 Sorcery (Jack DeJohnette album), 1974 jazz album by Jack DeJohnette
 Sorcery (Kataklysm album), 1995 death metal album by Kataklysm
 Sourcery, 1988 fantasy novel by Terry Pratchett
 Sorcery 101, 2005 webcomic by Kel McDonald

See also 

 Sorcerer (disambiguation)
 Sorceress (disambiguation)